The black storm petrel (Hydrobates melania) is a small seabird of the storm petrel family Hydrobatidae. It is 23 cm in length, with a wingspan of 46–51 cm.

The species breeds colonially on islands off the southern California coast of the United States and off the Baja Peninsula and Gulf of California of Mexico. Nesting sites are usually in rock crevices, occasionally in small burrows in soft earth. It also uses unused burrows from auklets. Colonies are attended nocturnally in order to avoid predatory birds such as gulls, hawks and owls. Like most petrels, its walking ability is limited to a short shuffle to the burrow. The female lays a single white egg per breeding season, if the egg is lost then it is replaced only rarely. Both parents share incubation duties, incubation lasting around 50 days. The chick is brooded for a few days after hatching until it is able to thermoregulate by itself, after which both parents forage to provide food. Chicks fledge 10 weeks after hatching.

The black storm petrel spends the rest of the year at sea, but occurring closer to shore than most other storm-petrels.   Because of this, it sometimes can be seen from the mainland. It undertakes a migration away from the waters surrounding its breeding colonies and, unusually, has two wintering grounds, one in the California Current off Central California and another further south off the coast of Central America as far south as Colombia and Ecuador. It is thought to migrate in this fashion in order to avoid hurricanes in its breeding grounds.

It feeds on mainly planktonic crustaceans, with a preference of larvae of spiny lobster.  It will also take small fish and offal.  It feeds using several techniques, including plunge diving to 1 m below the water's surface from flight, feeding while swimming on the surface, and feeding while flying. At sea it usually forages singly.

The black storm petrel is a common species, numbering several million pairs, and is not considered threatened. It has suffered losses on some of the breeding islands, particularly from feral cats and rats. Island restoration projects have removed these predators from several of its nesting islands.

It was formerly defined in the genus Oceanodroma before that genus was synonymized with Hydrobates.

References 

 "National Geographic"  Field Guide to the Birds of North America 
  Seabirds, an Identification Guide by Peter Harrison, (1983) 
 Handbook of the Birds of the World Vol 1,  Josep del Hoyo editor, 
 "National Audubon Society" The Sibley Guide to Birds, by David Allen Sibley, 
 Ainley, D. G., and W. T. Everett. 2001. Black Storm Petrel (Oceanodroma melania). In The Birds of North America, No. 577 (A. Poole and F. Gill, eds.). The Birds of North America, Inc., Philadelphia, PA.

External links 
 Black Storm Petrel photo gallery VIREO
 Black Storm Petrel photo; Article

black storm petrel
Fauna of California
Fauna of the San Francisco Bay Area
Birds of Mexico
Birds of Central America
Birds of the Pacific Ocean
Birds of Colombia
Birds of Ecuador
black storm petrel
black storm petrel